Robert Charles Devereux, 17th Viscount Hereford (11 August 1865 – 16 April 1952) was a member of the House of Lords and Premier Viscount of England.

Life
The only son of Robert Devereux, 16th Viscount Hereford and The Hon. Mary Morgan, youngest daughter of Charles, 1st Baron Tredegar (1843–1924), Lord Hereford attended New College, Oxford before marrying Ethel Mildred Shaw (d. 1945), daughter John Shaw, of Welburn Hall, Yorkshire. The Viscountess Hereford was appointed DJStJ ; they had three children including The Hon. Robert Godfrey de Bohun Devereux (1894–1934), whose son succeeded in the family titles.

Lord Hereford, who lived at Hampton Court, Herefordshire, was elected Alderman of Brecon County Council from 1898 until 1904. He served as a JP, DL and Chairman of Breconshire Quarter Sessions as well as being appointed KJStJ.

Arms

Death
He died with his stated home at Hampton Court (Castle) near Leominster and at that point left British assets in probates of 1952 and 1953 of which about  being settled land totalling

See also 
 Devereux baronets

References

External links
Devereux family genealogy
Hereford, Viscount (E, 1550)

1865 births
1952 deaths
Robert 17
Robert
People from Herefordshire
People educated at Eton College
Alumni of New College, Oxford
Deputy Lieutenants of Herefordshire
Deputy Lieutenants of Brecknockshire
Knights of Justice of the Order of St John